The Bloedel Reserve is a  forest garden on Bainbridge Island, Washington, United States. It was created by Virginia and Prentice Bloedel, the vice-chairman of the lumber company MacMillan Bloedel Limited, under the influence of the conservation movement and Asian philosophy. The couple wished to 'capture the essence of the Japanese garden—the qualities of naturalness, subtlety, reverence, tranquility—and construct a Western expression of it'. Although the Reserve includes a traditional Japanese garden, the Bloedels' approach for the rest of the property stands in contrast to that of 'Japanese gardens' which achieve their effects through the use of ornament. The Bloedel Reserve has both natural and highly landscaped lakes, immaculate lawns, woods, a stone garden (formerly the swimming pool where poet Theodore Roethke drowned in 1963), a moss garden, a rhododendron glen,  and a reflection garden designed with the assistance of landscape architects Richard Haag, Thomas Church, Kazimir Wall, and Danielle Stern. The Bloedels' French Chateau-style home, including many original furnishings, is preserved as a visitor center.

The Reserve opened to the public in 1988 as a family run foundation and registered as a 501(c)3 public charity in 2010. It is open year-round.

See also
 List of botanical gardens in the United States

References

External links

Bainbridge Island, Washington
Botanical gardens in Washington (state)
Gardens_in_Washington_(state)
Parks in Kitsap County, Washington
Japanese-American culture in Washington (state)
Japanese gardens in the United States
1988 establishments in Washington (state)
University of Washington organizations